The Stevens football team represented the Stevens Institute of Technology in college football.

History
Stevens was one of the first five college football teams.  In 1873, representatives of Princeton, Yale, Columbia, and Rutgers met in New York City to establish the first American intercollegiate rules for football on the model of the London Football Association. As the game developed in the United States it became progressively more violent and Stevens became disadvantaged.  The alumni magazine commented that the style of the game became too difficult and required an enormous amount of time and training which could be afforded by larger colleges, but would add too much work to the already difficult academic coursework at Stevens. President Alexander Crombie Humphreys ended the football program after the 1924 season.

References

 
American football teams established in 1872
1872 establishments in New Jersey
American football teams disestablished in 1924
1924 disestablishments in New Jersey